Australian Survivor is an Australian adventure reality game show based on the international Survivor format. Following the premise of other versions of the Survivor format, the show features a group of contestants, referred to as "castaways" as they are marooned in an isolated location. The castaways must provide food, water, fire, and shelter for themselves. The contestants compete in various challenges for rewards and immunity from elimination. The contestants are progressively eliminated from the game as they are voted off the island by their fellow castaways. The final castaway remaining is awarded the title of "Sole Survivor" and the grand prize of A$500,000.

The series first aired in 2002 on the Nine Network, who , also hold the first-run Australian broadcast rights to the flagship American edition of Survivor. In 2006, a celebrity edition aired on the Seven Network. Both iterations of the series only lasted one season due to low ratings.

In November 2015, Network Ten announced at its network upfronts that it would be reviving the series in 2016. The series commenced airing on 21 August 2016. Unlike its predecessors, the series was renewed by Network Ten for another season for 2017, and has continued to be successful since. Most recently, Australian Survivor , is currently airing  its 10th season titled Heroes V Villians, which premiered on 30 January 2023., with the season being filmed on the island of Upolu in Samoa. This is following the previous two seasons, which were filmed in Outback Queensland, due to travel restrictions as well as safety concerns resulting from the COVID-19 pandemic.

Format 

The show follows the same general format as the other editions of Survivor. To begin, the players are split into two or three tribes and taken to a remote, isolated location and are forced to live off the land with meagre supplies for several weeks. Frequent physical and mental challenges are used to pit the tribes against each other for rewards such as food, luxuries, or for immunity, forcing the other tribe to attend Tribal Council, where they must vote one of their tribemates out of the game by secret ballot.

About halfway through the game, the tribes are merged into a single tribe, and challenges are on an individual basis; winning immunity prevents that player from being voted out. Most players voted out during this stage become members of the Tribal Council Jury. When only two players remain (three players in Blood vs Water), the Final Tribal Council is held. The finalists plead their case to the Jury as to why they should win the game. The jurors then have the opportunity to interrogate the finalists before casting their vote for which finalist should be awarded the title of Sole Survivor and win the grand prize of A$500,000 (or a A$100,000 charity prize in the 2006 celebrity season).

Like other editions of the show, the Australian edition has introduced numerous modifications or twists on the core rules to prevent players from over-relying on strategies that succeeded in prior seasons or other editions of the show. These changes have included tribe switches, players being exiled from their tribe for a short period of time, hidden immunity idols that players can use to save themselves or another player at Tribal Council from being voted off, voting powers that can be used to influence the result at Tribal Council and players being given a chance to return following their elimination.

Survivor in Australia
The first Australian version of the Survivor format was filmed in late 2001, and aired in 2002 on the Nine Network. The program was a contractual obligation if the network were to be allowed to continue to broadcast American Survivor. The program was criticised for poor casting and lower production value than the popular American edition and it was not renewed due to low ratings. The Nine Network still hold the first-run rights to American Survivor and have continued to broadcast the American edition of the program ever since. Since 2013, recent seasons air on Nine's secondary channel; 9Go! and streamed on 9Now within hours of the original American airing,  with most season since 2015 airing the finale as a Simulcast of the American Eastern Time broadcast, across Australia.

In 2006, the Seven Network found a loophole in the contract between the Nine Network and Castaway Television which allowed them to produce a celebrity version of the series due to a celebrity format being viewed as different from the original format. The Seven Network did not renew the series.

In November 2015, Network Ten revealed at its upfront event that it would air a new season featuring regular contestants to air in the last quarter of 2016. This new season gave Australian Survivor the distinction of being one of the few Australian programs to have aired across all three major commercial television networks in Australia. Australian Survivor has continued to air yearly, concluding its most recent season in April 2022.

Following Network Ten's acquisition by CBS (the United States broadcaster of the format) in 2017, starting in December 2018, CBS made the complete American Survivor series available on their paid Australian streaming platform, Paramount+ (previously known as 10 All Access until August 2021). The broadcasts include Survivor US: Marquesas, which never aired in Australia due to Nine Network's commitment in airing their 2002 version of Australian Survivor. Originally, a select few seasons are also uploaded to Network Ten's free streaming site, 10 Play. As of June 2022, all seasons are uploaded to 10Play. Each US season is uploaded sometime after the season has aired on Nine Network, when the rights to that season revert to CBS under their agreement. 

Additionally, as of September 2020, both seasons of Survivor NZ and the Philippines and Island of Secrets editions of Survivor South Africa were also uploaded on 10 Play. Starting with the Immunity Island edition of the South African series, 10 Play offered same-day streaming of the series as it aired in Africa.

Season list

Notes

Broadcast and ratings 

Notes

Companion series
In addition to the main program, two companion web programs are also produced for Australian Survivor with both airings on 10's free video on demand streaming service 10 Play.

Jury Villa
Introduced in the 3rd season, Jury Villa is based on the Ponderosa series from American Survivor. The series follows the castaways that are voted off during the jury phase of the game as they become members of the Tribal Council Jury and interact with one another in the villa. Each episode focuses primarily on the latest evictee and their arrival in the villa. Episodes are released through 10 Play following the airing of each episode of the main show of the Jury phase of the game.

Talking Tribal
Introduced in the All Stars season, Talking Tribal is an aftershow that unpacks all of the castaway's strategies from the main show. The show premiered on Friday 31 January 2020, days before the premiere of All-Stars for a preview special. The show then airs weekly after each Wednesday night episode of the main show. In addition to airing as web series on 10 Play, the series also airs as an audio podcast on 10's podcast platform 10 speaks. The first season was hosted by former contestant Luke Toki and television presenter James Mathison, who were joined by Australia's Next Top Model Season 7 20th Place Contestant and Rob Has A Podcast podcaster Shannon Guss as a regular panelist and Sarah Tilleke, Osher Günsberg, Matt Farrelly and Shaun Hampson as guest panelists.

Talking Tribals second season (companion to the Brains V Brawn edition of the show) was hosted by Luke Toki and radio host Nathan Morris, who were joined by Shannon Guss and Nick Iadanza.

Mathison and Guss were joined by the winner and the runner-up of Brains V Brawn, Hayley Leake and George Mladenov, in the third season of Talking Tribal during Blood V Water.

Brooke Jowett from the third season and All Stars, alongside Khanh Ong from Blood V Water, joined Guss in the fourth season of Talking Tribal during Heroes V Villains.

International broadcast
The series airs on the following channels outside of Australia:

In New Zealand the series airs on TVNZ 2, with the series also being available on TVNZ+.
In the United Kingdom, the series airs on Amazon Prime Video.
In the United States, the series aired on Paramount+ but is not currently available as of 14 February 2022 due to the service losing streaming rights.

Awards and nominations

See also

Other versions
American Survivor
British Survivor
Survivor NZ
Survivor South Africa

Similar shows
 Alone Australia
 Big Brother Australia
 I'm a Celebrity...Get Me Out of Here!
 Million Dollar Island
 The Bridge
 The Big Adventure
 Treasure Island

References

External links
 
 

Australian Survivor
2000s Australian game shows
2002 Australian television series debuts
2002 Australian television series endings
2006 Australian television series debuts
2006 Australian television series endings
2010s Australian game shows
2016 Australian television series debuts
2020s Australian game shows
2000s Australian reality television series
2010s Australian reality television series
2020s Australian reality television series
Australian television series based on Swedish television series
Australian television series revived after cancellation
Network 10 original programming
Nine Network original programming
Seven Network original programming
Television series by Endemol Australia